The fourth season of The Crown, which follows the life and reign of Queen Elizabeth II, was released by Netflix on 15 November 2020.

Olivia Colman stars as Elizabeth, with main cast members Tobias Menzies, Helena Bonham Carter, Josh O'Connor, Marion Bailey, Erin Doherty and Emerald Fennell all reprising their roles from the third season.  Gillian Anderson, Emma Corrin and Stephen Boxer are added to the main cast. Additionally, Charles Dance returns in the season's first episode and Claire Foy reprises her role as Elizabeth in a cameo flashback scene.

Premise 
The Crown traces the life of Queen Elizabeth II from her wedding in 1947 to the present day.

The fourth season covers the time period between 1979 and 1990, is set during Margaret Thatcher's 11-year run as prime minister. Lady Diana Spencer is introduced early in the series. Events depicted include the wedding of Prince Charles and Lady Diana Spencer, their 1983 tour of Australia and New Zealand, the Falklands War, Michael Fagan's break-in at Buckingham Palace, Lord Mountbatten's funeral, the Princess of Wales's appearance at the Barnardo's Champion Children Awards, and at the end of the series, Thatcher's departure from office, as well as the marital difficulties of Charles and Diana.

Cast

Main

 Olivia Colman as Queen Elizabeth II
 Tobias Menzies as Prince Philip, Duke of Edinburgh, Elizabeth's husband
 Helena Bonham Carter as Princess Margaret, Elizabeth's younger sister
 Gillian Anderson as Margaret Thatcher, Prime Minister of the United Kingdom
 Josh O'Connor as Prince Charles, Elizabeth and Philip's eldest child and the heir apparent
 Emma Corrin as Lady Diana Spencer, Charles's fiancée; later, as Diana, Princess of Wales, his wife
 Marion Bailey as Queen Elizabeth The Queen Mother, Elizabeth II's mother
 Erin Doherty as Princess Anne, Elizabeth and Philip's second child and only daughter
 Stephen Boxer as Denis Thatcher, Margaret Thatcher's husband
 Emerald Fennell as Camilla Parker Bowles, Charles's long-time lover

Featured 
The following actors are credited in the opening titles of single episodes in which they play a significant role:
 Charles Dance as Lord Mountbatten, Philip's uncle and a father figure to Charles
 Tom Brooke as Michael Fagan, a man who entered Elizabeth's bedroom in Buckingham Palace in 1982
 Richard Roxburgh as Bob Hawke, the Prime Minister of Australia
 Tom Burke as Dazzle Jennings, a friend and confidant of Princess Margaret
 Nicholas Farrell as Michael Shea, the Queen's press secretary
 Claire Foy as young Queen Elizabeth, in 1947

Recurring 

 Angus Imrie as Prince Edward, Elizabeth and Philip's youngest child
 Tom Byrne as Prince Andrew, Elizabeth and Philip's third child
 Freddie Fox as Mark Thatcher, son of Margaret Thatcher
 Rebecca Humphries as Carol Thatcher, daughter of Margaret Thatcher
 Charles Edwards as Lord Charteris of Amisfield, Private Secretary to the Queen
 Richard Goulding as Edward Adeane, Private Secretary to the Prince of Wales, and son of former private secretary to the Queen Lord Adeane
 Penny Downie as Princess Alice, Duchess of Gloucester, paternal aunt-by-marriage of Elizabeth and widow of Prince Henry, Duke of Gloucester
 Sam Phillips as the Queen's equerry
 Letty Thomas as Virginia Pitman, one of Diana's flatmates
 Allegra Marland as Carolyn Pride, one of Diana's flatmates
 Flora Higgins as Anne Bolton, one of Diana's flatmates
 Geoffrey Breton as Mark Phillips, Princess Anne's husband
 Kevin McNally as Bernard Ingham, Downing Street Press Secretary 
 Paul Jesson as Sir Geoffrey Howe, Chancellor of the Exchequer; later Foreign Secretary, Leader of the House of Commons and Deputy Prime Minister of the United Kingdom
 Nicholas Day as Jim Prior, Secretary of State for Employment 
 Richard Syms as Lord Hailsham, Lord High Chancellor of Great Britain 
 Peter Pacey as Lord Soames, Leader of the House of Lords (and Sir Winston Churchill's son-in-law) 
 Paul Bigley as John Nott, Secretary of State for Business, Energy and Industrial Strategy 
 Don Gallagher as Willie Whitelaw, Deputy Prime Minister of the United Kingdom 
 Guy Siner as Francis Pym, Secretary of State for Defence 
 Georgie Glen as Ruth, Lady Fermoy, the Queen Mother's lady-in-waiting and Diana's maternal grandmother
 Dugald Bruce-Lockhart as John Moore, Secretary of State for Work and Pensions 
 Judith Paris as Wendy Mitchell, Lady Diana's dance teacher
 Dominic Rowan as Charles Powell, Private Secretary for Foreign Affairs to the Prime Minister
 Andrew Buchan as Andrew Parker Bowles, Camilla's husband
 Tony Jayawardena as Sir Shridath Ramphal, Commonwealth Secretary-General 
 Alana Ramsey as Sarah Lindsay, a Buckingham Palace press officer and wife of Major Hugh Lindsay
 Jessica Aquilina as Sarah Ferguson, fiancée and later wife of Andrew
 Tom Turner as Patrick Jephson, Diana's private secretary
 David Phelan as Dickie Arbiter, Press Secretary to the Queen
 Lucas Barber-Grant as Prince William, Charles and Diana's elder son
 Arran Tinker as Prince Harry, Charles and Diana's younger son
 Daniel Fraser as the Queen's equerry

Notable guests 

 Isobel Eadie as Lady Sarah Spencer / Lady Sarah McCorquodale, Lady Diana's elder sister
 Harriet Benson as Lady Brabourne, daughter of Lord Mountbatten
 Valerie Sarruf as The Dowager Lady Brabourne, Lord Brabourne's mother
 Brandon Whitt as Timothy Knatchbull, Lord Mountbatten's grandson
 Evan Whitt as Nicholas Knatchbull, Lord Mountbatten's grandson
 Mark Carlisle as Lord Brabourne, Lord Mountbatten's son-in-law
 Patrick McBrearty as Francis McGirl
 Mark Brennan as Thomas McMahon
 Roy Sampson as Laurens van der Post
 Billy Mack as Ghillie
 Karina Orr as Anne-Charlotte Verney, French rally driver
 Pierre Philippe as Jean Garnier
 Oscar Foronda as Constantino Davidoff
 Douglas Reith as Admiral Henry Leach, First Sea Lord and Chief of the Naval Staff 
 Leanne Everitt as Christine Fagan, Michael Fagan's wife 
 Elliott Hughes and Jasper Hughes as the infant Prince William
 Adam Fitzgerald as Graham Evans
 Naomi Allisstone as Hazel Hawke, Prime Minister Bob Hawke's wife
 Harry Treadaway as Roddy Llewellyn, Princess Margaret's former lover
 Nancy Carroll as Lady Glenconner, Princess Margaret's lady-in-waiting
 Richard Teverson as Lord Glenconner, husband of Lady Glenconner 
 Gemma Jones as Penelope Carter, Princess Margaret's therapist
 Trudie Emery as Katherine Bowes-Lyon, Elizabeth and Margaret's first cousin, niece of Queen Elizabeth The Queen Mother and sister of Princess Anne of Denmark 
 Pauline Hendrickson as Nerissa Bowes-Lyon, Elizabeth and Margaret's first cousin, niece of Queen Elizabeth The Queen Mother and sister of Princess Anne of Denmark
 Eva Feiler as young Margaret Thatcher
 Tom Espiner as Simon Freeman, a Sunday Times reporter
 Peter Symonds as Hardy Amies, Royal Warrant holder as designer to the Queen
 Jay Webb as Wayne Sleep
 Daniel Donskoy as James Hewitt, Princess Diana's lover
 Lin Sagovsky as Elspeth Howe, Geoffrey Howe's wife, who is Camilla's aunt
 Annette Badland as Dr Margaret Heagarty, director of paediatrics at Harlem Hospital
 Nadia Williams as Veronica Middleton-Jeter, a social worker at Henry Street Settlement
 Ailema Sousa as Linda Correa, a homeless mother of three
 Nick Wymer as Kenneth Clarke, Secretary of State for Health; later Secretary of State for Education 
 Al Barclay as Michael Howard, Secretary of State for Employment 
 Keith Chopping as Norman Lamont, Chief Secretary to the Treasury 
 Martin Fisher as Peter Lilley, Secretary of State for Business, Energy and Industrial Strategy 
 Marc Ozall as John Major, Foreign Secretary; later Chancellor of the Exchequer 
 Duncan Duff as Cecil Parkinson, Secretary of State for Transport 
 Oliver Milburn as Chris Patten, Secretary of State for the Environment 
 Michael Mears as Malcolm Rifkind, Secretary of State for Scotland 
 Stephen Greif as Bernard Weatherill, Speaker of the House of Commons

Episodes

Production

Development 
By October 2017, "early production" had begun on an anticipated third and fourth season, and by the following January, Netflix confirmed the series had been renewed for a third and fourth season.

Casting 
The producers recast some roles with older actors every two seasons, as the characters age. In October 2017, Olivia Colman was cast as Queen Elizabeth II for the third and fourth seasons. By January 2018, Helena Bonham Carter and Paul Bettany were in negotiations to portray Princess Margaret and Prince Philip, respectively, for these seasons. However, by the end of the month Bettany was forced to drop out due to the time commitment required. By the end of March 2018, Tobias Menzies was cast as Philip for the third and fourth seasons. In early May 2018, Bonham Carter was confirmed to have been cast. The next month, Erin Doherty was cast as Princess Anne. A month later, Josh O'Connor and Marion Bailey were cast as Prince Charles and the Queen Mother, respectively, for the third and fourth seasons. In October 2018, Emerald Fennell was cast as Camilla Shand. In December 2018, Charles Dance was cast as Louis Mountbatten. In April 2019, Emma Corrin was cast as Lady Diana Spencer for the fourth season. In September 2019 Gillian Anderson, who had been rumoured since that January to be in talks to portray Margaret Thatcher in the fourth season, was officially confirmed for the role.

Filming 
The fourth season began filming in August 2019 and completed in March 2020. The producers confirmed that filming was completed ahead of the COVID-19 pandemic lockdown; the release date was not delayed.

Music

Release 
The fourth season was released on Netflix on 15 November 2020. It was released on DVD and Blu-ray on 2 November 2021.

Reception 
Rotten Tomatoes reported a 95% approval rating for the season based on 107 reviews, with an average rating of 8.62/10 and a critical consensus: "Whatever historical liberties The Crown takes are easily forgiven thanks to the sheer power of its performances – particularly Gillian Anderson's imposing take on The Iron Lady and newcomer Emma Corrin's embodiment of a young Princess Diana." On Metacritic, the season holds a score of 86 out of 100 based on 28 critics, indicating "universal acclaim".

Writing in The Atlantic, Shirley Li describes the drama as "sharper than ever" and "splashy", but observes that, in contrast to the first three seasons, the fourth criticises the Queen for her "ignorance" and "stubborn devotion to tradition". In the Evening Standard, Katie Rosseinsky wrote that the season's episodes are "dizzyingly beautiful and staggering in scope", and highlights the outstanding performances of Anderson and Corrin as Thatcher and Lady Diana, respectively. In The New Zealand Herald, university professor Giselle Bastin described the season as "a masterly portrait of the turbulent 1980s" and complimented the production standards, casting and acting. BBC's arts editor, Will Gompertz, gave the series a rating of four out of five, praising Corrin and Bonham Carter but criticising Anderson's performance for "forever craning her neck from side-to-side as if scanning for a tasty lettuce leaf, while over-egging her Thatcher impression to such an extent she is close to unwatchable at times".

In a critical review, Dominic Patten of Deadline Hollywood complimented the earlier seasons but said that the fourth had "substantially tweaked timelines" and was "sub-standard soap", and that, despite Colman's performance, some of the other characters were like "Spitting Image live-action caricature[s]". Writing in The Guardian, Simon Jenkins described the season as "fake history", "reality hijacked as propaganda, and a cowardly abuse of artistic licence" which fabricated history to suit its own preconceived narrative. The season has reportedly received backlash from the British royal family and some royal commentators. Royal historian Hugo Vickers stated: "In this particular series, every member of the royal family...comes out of it badly, except the Princess of Wales (Diana). It's totally one sided, it's totally against Prince Charles". Royal biographer Penny Junor criticised the season as portraying the British royal family as "villains", stating that "The Crown's royals are wild, cruel distortions of the people I've known for 40 years".

Season four became the first drama series to sweep all categories at the 2021 Primetime Emmy Awards. Olivia Colman and Claire Foy won the 2021 Primetime Emmy Award for Outstanding Lead Actress in a Drama Series and Outstanding Guest Actress in a Drama Series respectively for the episode "48:1." Josh O'Connor won the 2021 Primetime Emmy Award for Outstanding Lead Actor in a Drama Series for the episode "Terra Nullius." Tobias Menzies won the 2021 Primetime Emmy Award for Outstanding Supporting Actor in a Drama Series for the episode "Gold Stick." Gillian Anderson won the 2021 Primetime Emmy Award for Outstanding Supporting Actress in a Drama Series for her performance in the episode "Favourites."

References

External links
 
 

2020 American television seasons
2020 British television seasons
4
Television series set in 1979
Television series set in the 1980s
Television series set in 1990